In Roman mythology, according to Arnobius, Puta presided over the pruning of trees and was a minor goddess of agriculture.

References

Roman goddesses
Nature goddesses
Agricultural goddesses